Linda was a feminist literary magazine which existed between 1887 and 1905. It was the first women's magazine in the country as reflected in its subtitle, Esimene literatuurlik ja ajakohane ajakiri Eesti naisterahvale (Estonian: The first literary periodical for the Estonian women).

History and profile
Linda was founded by the Estonian journalist, pedagogue and feminist Lilli Suburg in 1887 to make Estonian women aware of the ideas of feminism. The first issue appeared on October that year. She also edited the magazine until 1893 and a short period in 1894. The headquarters of Linda was in Viljandi. In 1891 the magazine became a regular weekly publication. 

It featured articles on relationships, home activities and emancipation of women. The magazine also offered translated fiction texts, literary criticism and original works mostly written by Suburg in addition to biographies of Estonian writers. In 1894 Suburg was forced to sell Linda which continued to be published by A. Jürgenstein until 1905.

All issues of the magazine were digitized by the National Library of Estonia.

References

1887 establishments in the Russian Empire
1905 disestablishments in the Russian Empire
Defunct literary magazines published in Europe
Defunct magazines published in Estonia
Feminist magazines
Estonian-language magazines
Magazines established in 1887
Magazines disestablished in 1905
Weekly magazines
Women's magazines
Mass media in Viljandi